Saker Baptist College is an all-girls secondary school located in Limbe, Cameroon. The school was founded in 1962 by Baptist missionaries.

As of 2020, the school has 749 students.

School alumni host a non-profit organisation called ExSSA.

History
On 27 January 2007, a chapel worth CFA 200 million was given to the college.

The front of the college was renovated in 2020 as part of a road surfacing initiative.

References

External links

 http://exssa-usa.org/
 http://exssa-uk.org

Secondary schools in Cameroon
Boarding schools in Cameroon
Boarding schools in the South West Region
Educational institutions established in 1962
1962 establishments in Cameroon
Girls' schools in Cameroon